Lyon Hall may refer to:

Lyon Hall (Demopolis, Alabama), a historic house in Demopolis, Alabama.
Lyon Hall on the Cornell West Campus in Ithaca, New York.

Architectural disambiguation pages